The Busan Gudeok Stadium (Hanja: 釜山九德運動場) is a multi-purpose stadium in Busan, South Korea. It is currently used mostly for football matches. The stadium currently holds 12,349 spectators. The venue opened in September 1928 as Busan Municipal Stadium. During the 1988 Summer Olympics, it hosted some of the Olympic football matches. It was also the  main venue for the 1997 East Asian Games hosting the opening and closing ceremonies, as well as the athletics and football competitions. Professional football team Busan IPark have played their home games at the venue since 2015 as well as between 1987 and 2002. Additionally, non-league football team Busan Transport Corporation FC have played their home games at the venue since 2006.

1988 Summer Olympics 
During the 1988 Summer Olympics, held in Seoul, eight football games took place at the Gudeok stadium, including all three of South Korea's matches and one semi-final match. 180 players accompanied by 72 officials from nine countries competed for eleven days from September 17 through September 27, attracting a total of 146,320 spectators or 18,290 on average per day. A total of 675 million won was spent on the stadium before the tournament to improve the electronic scoreboard and other facilities.

1959 crowd crush

On July 17, 1959, 67 persons died after heavy rain triggered a rush to a narrow entrance.

References 

1988 Summer Olympics official report. Volume 1. Part 1. p. 204.
Stadium of dreams in K-League : 구덕 운동장

External links
 Busan Sports Facilities Management Center 
 Busan Sports Facilities Management Center 
 World Stadiums

Football venues in South Korea
Venues of the 1988 Summer Olympics
Olympic football venues
Sports venues in Busan
Multi-purpose stadiums in South Korea
Busan IPark
Sports venues completed in 1928
Venues of the 1986 Asian Games
Venues of the 2002 Asian Games
Asian Games football venues
K League 1 stadiums
K League 2 stadiums